The year 1670 in science and technology involved some significant events.

Botany
 John Ray publishes Catalogus plantarum Angliæ, the basis of all later floras of England.
 The predecessor of the Royal Botanic Garden Edinburgh is opened as a physic garden by Drs Robert Sibbald and Andrew Balfour in Holyrood, Edinburgh, Scotland.

Earth sciences
 Jean Picard calculates the Earth radius to within 0.44% of the modern value.
 Agostino Scilla publishes  ("Vain Speculation Undeceived by Sense") in Naples, arguing for an organic origin for fossils.

Technology
 The first longcase clock is built in England by William Clement.

Births
 February 25 – Maria Margarethe Kirch born Winckelmann, German astronomer (died 1720)

Deaths
 March 10 – Johann Rudolf Glauber, German chemist (born 1604)
 May 21 – Niccolò Zucchi, Italian astronomer (born 1586)

References

 
17th century in science
1670s in science